I, etcetera is a 1978 collection of short stories by Susan Sontag.

Contents
 “Project for a trip to China”
 “Debriefing”
 “American spirits”
 “The dummy”
 “Old complaints revisited”
 “Baby”
 “Doctor Jekyll”
 “Unguided tour”

Editions
  (New York: Farrar Straus Giraux, hardcover, 1978)
  (New York: Picador, trade paperback, 2002)

External links
 Review of short stories in Slate
 Official page
 Excerpt from "Project for a trip to China" on official site

1978 short story collections
American short story collections
Works by Susan Sontag